Lek-Heng Lim is a Singaporean mathematician.

Lim earned a bachelor's degree at the National University of Singapore, studied for his master's at Cornell University and the University of Cambridge, and completed a doctorate at Stanford University. Lim started his teaching career at the University of California, Berkeley, where he served as Charles Morrey Assistant Professor. He later joined the University of Chicago faculty. In 2020, Lim was also elected a fellow of the American Mathematical Society.

Lim was awarded a Guggenheim Fellowship in April 2022.

References

Living people
University of Chicago faculty
Fellows of the American Mathematical Society
Year of birth missing (living people)
Singaporean expatriates in the United Kingdom
Singaporean expatriates in the United States
Alumni of the University of Cambridge
Cornell University alumni
Stanford University alumni
National University of Singapore alumni
Singaporean mathematicians
University of California, Berkeley faculty